Court Harwell may refer to

Court Harwell (horse), a racehorse
, a cargo ship in service 1968–69